Bellator MMA (formerly known as "Bellator Fighting Championships") is an American mixed martial arts promotion, and the following is a history of its champions in each weight class.

At the time of its inception in 2008, CEO Bjorn Rebney founded Bellator Fighting Championships as a tournament based organization. The inaugural champion for each weight class was determined by the winner of an eight-man tournament. All subsequent title challengers were required to first win an eight-man tournament in a specific weight class in order to earn the right to challenge that division's reigning champion. Dethroned champions were required to re-enter the tournaments in order to attempt to regain their title. Under Bjorn Rebney's sole leadership, Bellator MMA would strictly adhere to these rules during the first four years of its operation.

The first changes to this format would begin to appear not long after Viacom, Inc. purchased a controlling stake in the organization. In November 2012, CEO Bjorn Rebney announced the introduction of a "championship rematch clause". This would allow Bellator to schedule an immediate title-fight rematch if officials deemed the fight necessary. The next major change occurred during Bellator's 2013 Summer Series when it was announced that all three tournaments would be shorter, four-man affairs instead of the standard eight. Though originally stated to return to the eight-man only tournaments afterwards, officials instead decided to add two additional four-man tournaments to the existing tournament lineup in an effort to provide a more consistent flow of title challengers for their champions to face.

Two additional rule changes would be announced. The first was the "tournament champion replacement clause" introduced in August 2013. This allowed officials to grant title shots to replacement fighters when tournament winners were injured, or otherwise unavailable, through a complex voting and points system. Then, in June 2014, CEO Bjorn Rebney made an announcement stating that any fighter who had previously won a Bellator tournament would maintain permanent eligibility to fight for a title without having to re-enter another tournament. Neither of these changes would ever be implemented, however, as one week later Bellator MMA and its founder and CEO Bjorn Rebney parted ways, bringing about an end to the organization's tournament based model.

Current champions

Men's championship history

Heavyweight World Championship
206 to 265 lbs (93 to 120 kg)

Light Heavyweight World Championship
186 to 205 lbs (84 to 93 kg)

Middleweight World Championship
171 to 185 lbs (77 to 84 kg)

Welterweight World Championship
156 to 170 lbs (70 to 77 kg)

Lightweight World Championship
146 to 155 lbs (66 to 70 kg)

Featherweight World Championship
136 to 145 lbs (61 to 66 kg)

Bantamweight World Championship
126 to 135 lbs (57 to 61 kg)

Women's championship history

Women's Featherweight World Championship
126 to 145 lbs (57 to 66 kg)

Women's Flyweight World Championship
116 to 125 lbs (53 to 57 kg)

Defunct titles

Women's Strawweight World Championship
Under

Tournament winners
Originally, all title challengers were determined through these tournaments with the winners earning the right to challenge the reigning champion at that weight class or, if necessary, be allowed to compete for an interim or vacant title.

Bellator Fighting Championships: Season One
(April 3, 2009 - June 19, 2009)

Bellator Fighting Championships: Season Two
(April 8, 2010 - June 24, 2010)

Bellator Fighting Championships: Season Three
(August 12, 2010 - October 28, 2010)

Bellator Fighting Championships: Season Four
(March 5, 2011 - May 21, 2011)

Bellator Fighting Championships: 2011 Summer Series
(June 25, 2011 - August 20, 2011)

Bellator Fighting Championships: Season Five
(September 27, 2011 - November 26, 2011)

Bellator Fighting Championships: Season Six
(March 9, 2012 - May 25, 2012)

Bellator Fighting Championships: 2012 Summer Series
(June 22, 2012 - July 24, 2012)

Bellator Fighting Championships: Season Seven
(September 28, 2012 - December 14, 2012)

Bellator Fighting Championships: Season Eight
(January 17, 2013 - April 4, 2013)

Bellator Fighting Championships: 2013 Summer Series
(June 19, 2013 - July 31, 2013)
All three tournaments were shortened, four-man tournaments instead of the standard eight.

Bellator MMA: Season Nine
(September 7, 2013 - November 22, 2013)

Bellator MMA: Season Ten
(February 28, 2014 – May 17, 2014)

Bellator MMA: 2014 Summer Series
(June 6, 2014 – July 25, 2014)

Bellator MMA: Dynamite 1
(September 19, 2015)
A one night, four-man light heavyweight tournament.

Bellator Heavyweight World Grand Prix Tournament
(January 20, 2018 - January 26, 2019)
Year long, eight-man heavyweight tournament to crown a new heavyweight champion.

Bellator Welterweight World Grand Prix Tournament
(September 29, 2018 - October 26, 2019)
Year long, eight-man welterweight tournament. Current welterweight champion, Rory MacDonald, is a participant and will defend the title until the end of the tournament. If he loses, the winner will be declared the new linear champion.

Bellator Featherweight World Grand Prix Tournament
(September 28, 2019 - July 31, 2021)
Year long, sixteen-man featherweight tournament. Current featherweight champion, Patrício Freire, is a participant and will defend the title until the end of the tournament. If he loses, the winner will be declared the new linear champion.

Bellator Light Heavyweight World Grand Prix Tournament
(April 9, 2021 - November 18, 2022)
Year long, eight-man Light Heavyweight tournament. Current Light Heavyweight champion, Vadim Nemkov, is a participant and will defend the title until the end of the tournament. If he loses, the winner will be declared the new linear champion.

Champions by nationality
The division champions includes only linear champions. Interim champions who have never become linear champions will be listed as interim champions. Fighters with multiple title reigns in a specific division will also be counted once. Tournaments runners-up are not included.

Records

Most wins in title bouts
The following includes all fighters with three or more championship and/or interim championship title wins. Fighters with the same number of title wins are arranged in order of less title bouts losses. Tournament championships are not included.

Most consecutive title defenses
The following includes all Bellator champions who were able to consecutively defend their title two times or more. Fighters with the same number of title defenses are listed chronologically.

Multi-division champions
Fighters who have won championships in multiple weight classes. Tournament champions are not included.

Simultaneous two division champions

See also
 List of current Bellator fighters
 List of Bellator MMA alumni
 List of Bellator MMA events
 List of Bellator Kickboxing champions
 List of current mixed martial arts champions
 List of EliteXC champions
 List of Invicta FC champions
 List of ONE Championship champions
 List of Pride champions
 List of PFL champions
 List of Strikeforce champions
 List of UFC champions
 List of WEC champions
 Mixed martial arts weight classes

References

Bellator Champions, List Of